Colesloggett Halt is a small railway station on the Bodmin and Wenford Railway, a heritage railway in Cornwall, United Kingdom.

History
The station was originally built in 1993 to serve a local farm park which closed as a visitor attraction shortly after the station was built. Today it serves primarily as an access to Cardinham Woods, a local beauty spot.

Description
Colesloggett Halt consists of a single, short platform with a small station shelter. There is no car park.

Services
Due to the very steep gradient on the line, services normally only call on the journey towards Bodmin Parkway.

References

External links

 Bodmin and Wenford Railway

Heritage railway stations in Cornwall
Railway stations in Great Britain opened in 1993
Railway stations built for UK heritage railways
Bodmin and Wenford Railway